Marcos Baghdatis was the defending champion but retired from professional tennis in 2019.

Alex Bolt won the title after defeating Kamil Majchrzak 4–6, 6–4, 6–3 in the final.

Seeds

Draw

Finals

Top half

Bottom half

References

External links
Main draw
Qualifying draw

Nottingham Trophy - 1